Percy Tyson '"Plum" Lewis' (2 October 1884 – 30 January 1976) was a South African cricketer who played in one Test match in 1913.

After studying at Oxford University, Lewis played a few first-class matches, mostly for Western Province beginning in 1907–08. He made 151 in 185 minutes for Western Province against the MCC in the first match of the MCC's tour in 1913–14. He was unsuccessful in the match for Cape Province against the MCC two weeks later, but was still selected for the First Test. He was "c Woolley b Barnes 0" in each innings and South Africa lost by an innings and 157 runs, and Lewis was not selected for any further Tests.

He served in France in the First World War as a lieutenant and won the MC and Bar before being severely wounded in the leg. He also served as a lieutenant colonel in the Second World War, but not in combat. He worked as a lawyer.

References

External links

1884 births
1976 deaths
South Africa Test cricketers
South African cricketers
Western Province cricketers
H. D. G. Leveson Gower's XI cricketers